James Rockhill (born 20 May 1990), better known by his stage name Kove, is a British electronic music producer and DJ. His song "Way We Are", featuring Melissa Steel, entered the UK Singles Chart at number 30.

Career

2012–13: Early beginnings
Rockhill signed his debut double A-side single "Stellar" / "Breach" to Viper Recordings in 2012. It was released on 5 March 2012. His second single, "Iodine" / "Open Ground" was released on Andy C's Program on 8 October 2012. Rockhill released "Gone" / "Airlock" through Program in early 2013. Later in the year, he signed to Chase & Status's label MTA Records, remixing their comeback single "Lost & Not Found" and releasing his debut EP Measures through the label. The EP's first track, "Love for You", received heavy airplay on BBC Radio 1Xtra and marked the start of his commercial breakthrough.

2014–present: Breakthrough
Following remixes for Bastille and John Newman, he released the double A-side "Gobble" / "Melisma" through MTA on 16 February 2014. His first charting single, "Way We Are", was released in July 2014 and entered the UK Singles Chart at number 30. His next EP, Murmurations, was released on 5 October 2014 and includes the song "Drop" (premiered by Annie Mac).

Discography

Extended plays

Singles

Other appearances

Remixes

References

External links

Living people
British electronic musicians
English drum and bass musicians
1990 births
Musicians from London
British record producers